Long Pond, also known as Great Pond, is a nearly four mile long glacial lake located on Mount Desert Island in Hancock County, Maine, United States.

References

Lakes of Hancock County, Maine
Glacial lakes of the United States
Mount Desert Island
Lakes of Maine